Tillandsia roseiflora is a species in the genus Tillandsia. This species is endemic to Brazil.

References

roseiflora
Endemic flora of Brazil